The following is the final results of the 1990 World Weightlifting Championships. Men's competition were held in Budapest, Hungary between 10–18 November and Women's competition were held in Sarajevo, SR Bosnia and Herzegovina, Socialist Federal Republic of Yugoslavia between 26 May and 3 June.

Medal summary

Men

Women

Medal table
Ranking by Big (Total result) medals 

Ranking by all medals: Big (Total result) and Small (Snatch and Clean & Jerk)

References
Results (Sport 123)
Weightlifting World Championships Seniors Statistics

External links
Database

1990 in weightlifting
1990 in Hungarian sport
1990 in Yugoslav women's sport
1990
Weightlifting in Bosnia and Herzegovina
International weightlifting competitions hosted by Hungary
International sports competitions hosted by Bosnia and Herzegovina
International sports competitions in Budapest
1990 World Weightlifting Championships
1990 World Weightlifting Championships
November 1990 sports events in Europe